Helen Black may refer to:

Helen Cecelia Black (1838–1906), English journalist
Helen Chatfield Black (1924–2018), American naturalist and conservationist
Helen Marie Black (1896–1988), American business manager, journalist, and publicist
Helen Black (mayoress) (1896–1963), New Zealand mayoress and community worker